is a Japanese footballer currently playing as a midfielder for Kamatamare Sanuki.

Career statistics

Club
.

Notes

References

1997 births
Living people
Association football people from Tokushima Prefecture
Kansai University of International Studies alumni
Japanese footballers
Association football midfielders
J3 League players
Tokushima Vortis players
Kamatamare Sanuki players